The 1983–84 I-Divisioona season was the tenth season of the I-Divisioona, the second level of Finnish ice hockey. 10 teams participated in the league, and Lukko Rauma won the championship. Lukko Rauma and JYP Jyväskylä qualified for the promotion/relegation round of the SM-liiga.

Regular season

External links
 Season on hockeyarchives.info

I-Divisioona seasons
2
Fin